Mary Bruce (1282–1323) was the sister of Robert the Bruce, King of Scots.

Mary Bruce may also refer to:

Mary Bruce, Countess of Elgin (1778–1855), first wife of British diplomat Thomas Bruce, 7th Earl of Elgin
Mary Grant Bruce (1878–1958), Australian children's author and journalist
Mary Louisa Bruce, Countess of Elgin (1819–1898)